Hartshorne is a village and civil parish in the English county of Derbyshire. The population of the civil parish at the 2011 census was 3,888.   It is north of the town of Swadlincote.

The name is pronounced Harts-horne; the sh is not a digraph, as this is a compound.

Amenities

Local pubs include "The Admiral Rodney" named after the 1st Baron Rodney (1719–1792), "The Mill Wheel" (with an 18th-century mill wheel measuring  20 feet in diameter), "The Bulls Head" and  "The Greyhound". "The Chesterfield Arms"  was demolished in September 2009.  The "Snooty Fox" (formerly the "Dominoes") was demolished in 2009.  The "New Inn" closed in the 1960s and was then used as a hairdressing salon before being demolished in 1975 to make a car park extension for the "Admiral Rodney".

The Old Manor House in the northern part of the village is a Grade II* listed 17th century timbered building on Main Street. It was built for one John Benskin in 1629 according to parish rate records. Situated to the south west of St Peter's Church in the southern part of the village, it is distinct from The Manor House (also known as the Old Hall) in the northern part of the village.

History
Hartshorne was mentioned in the Domesday book as belonging to Henry de Ferrers and being worth ten shillings. It passed to the Ireland family in the fourteenth century, and subsequently to the family of the Foljambe baronets.

The Rector of Hartshorne, William Dethick, founded a free school for local children in 1626.

In 1800, the owner of the Manor, William Bailey Cant, left it to the lawyer Thomas Erskine, in recognition of his role in the case of John Horne Tooke.

Transport
The local bus service is the No.2 maintained by Arriva Midlands between Derby and Swadlincote via Melbourne, this was previously a Trent route 168 & Arriva route No.69.

Notable residents
George Stanhope, Dean of Canterbury, was born here in 1660

See also
Listed buildings in Hartshorne, Derbyshire

References

Bibliography

External links 

 Village website
 GENUKI(tm) page

Villages in Derbyshire
South Derbyshire District